Turner County is a county located in the south central portion of the U.S. state of Georgia. As of the 2020 census, the population was 9,006. The county seat is Ashburn. The county was created on August 18, 1905, and named for Henry Gray Turner, U.S. representative and Georgia state Supreme Court justice.

Geography

The eastern two-thirds of Turner County, from just west of Interstate 75 heading east, are located in the Alapaha River sub-basin of the Suwannee River basin. The southern and western portion of the county are located in the Little River sub-basin of the same Suwannee River basin. The entire western edge of Turner County is located in the Middle Flint River sub-basin of the ACF River Basin (Apalachicola-Chattahoochee-Flint River Basin).

Major highways

  Interstate 75
  U.S. Route 41
  State Route 7
  State Route 32
  State Route 32 Connector
  State Route 90
  State Route 107
  State Route 112
  State Route 159
  State Route 401 (unsigned designation for I-75)

Adjacent counties
 Wilcox County (northeast)
 Ben Hill County (east)
 Irwin County (east)
 Tift County (southeast)
 Worth County (southwest)
 Crisp County (northwest)

Demographics

2020 census

As of the 2020 United States census, there were 9,006 people, 3,169 households, and 2,297 families residing in the county.

2010 census
As of the 2010 United States Census, there were 8,930 people, 3,339 households, and 2,308 families residing in the county. The racial makeup of the county was 54.7% white, 41.6% black or African American, 0.4% Asian, 0.3% American Indian, 2.2% from other races, and 0.7% from two or more races. Those of Hispanic or Latino origin made up 3.2% of the population. In terms of ancestry, 12.3% were American, 9.4% were English, and 6.1% were Irish.

Of the 3,339 households, 34.4% had children under the age of 18 living with them, 44.9% were married couples living together, 19.4% had a female householder with no husband present, 30.9% were non-families, and 27.1% of all households were made up of individuals. The average household size was 2.56 and the average family size was 3.10. The median age was 38.7 years.

The median income for a household in the county was $30,763 and the median income for a family was $40,446. Males had a median income of $33,536 versus $22,835 for females. The per capita income for the county was $15,973. About 22.8% of families and 25.4% of the population were below the poverty line, including 31.2% of those under age 18 and 15.4% of those age 65 or over.

Communities
 Ashburn (county seat)
 Rebecca
 Sycamore

Notable people
Turner County is home to Paramedics Curtis Pylant and Brian Meadows who were awarded the Georgia Department of Public Health's first ever Medal of Honor for risking their lives to save a victim's life in a vehicle crash during a dramatic rescue.

Politics

See also

 National Register of Historic Places listings in Turner County, Georgia
List of counties in Georgia

References

 
Georgia (U.S. state) counties
1905 establishments in Georgia (U.S. state)
Populated places established in 1905